Manns Harbor is a census-designated place (CDP) in Dare County, North Carolina, United States. As of the 2010 census it had a population of 821.

Overview
Before the first settlers arrived in the vicinity of Manns Harbor, the Native American village Dasamongueponke existed on or close to the site.

Located east of the intersection of U.S. Routes 64 and 264, it is nestled along the western bank of Croatan Sound. Before 1957, Manns Harbor used to harbor a ferry that traversed the sound and provided access to Roanoke Island. Today, the William B. Umstead Bridge (completed in 1957) and the four-lane Virginia Dare Memorial Bridge (completed in 2002) link Manns Harbor on the mainland to Manteo on Roanoke Island. The community provides a gateway to North Carolina's Outer Banks.

The residents of Manns Harbor are governed by the Dare County Board of Commissioners.  Manns Harbor is part of District 1, along with Manteo, Roanoke Island, and Wanchese.

In 2013, local resident, Harry C. Mann, was indicted for nearly $334,000 in kickbacks from Chowan County metal recycling companies and others over six years to scrap metal and equipment from the range. Navy and Air Force pilots use the site on mainland Dare County off U.S. 264 south of Manns Harbor for target practice.

Demographics

2020 census

As of the 2020 United States census, there were 790 people, 311 households, and 255 families residing in the CDP.

Airports
The Hyde County Airport and Dare County Regional Airport are the closest airports.

Education
Residents are zoned to Dare County Schools. Zoned schools include Manteo Elementary School, Manteo Middle School, and Manteo High School.

References

Census-designated places in Dare County, North Carolina